Roberto Colom (born in Catalonia, Spain) is a Spanish differential psychologist and intelligence researcher.

Colom is Professor of Differential Psychology in the Department of Biological and Health Psychology at Universidad Autónoma de Madrid, from which he received his Ph.D. in 1989.

References

External links
Research website

Living people
1964 births
Spanish psychologists
Intelligence researchers
Differential psychologists
Autonomous University of Madrid alumni
Academic staff of the Autonomous University of Madrid